The Chehalem Mountains are a mountain range located in the Willamette Valley in the U.S. state of Oregon. Forming the southern boundary of the Tualatin Valley, the Chehalems are the highest mountains in the Willamette Valley. The range extends from the Willamette River east of Newberg northwest to the foothills of the Oregon Coast Range south of Forest Grove.

Toponymy
The word "Chehalem" is a corruption of the Atfalati Indian word "Chahelim," a name given in 1877 to one of the bands of Atfalati.

Geography
Composed of a single land mass that was uplifted by tectonic forces, the mountain range includes several spurs and ridges such as Parrett Mountain, Ribbon Ridge, and Bald Peak.

Chehalem Mountains AVA

The Chehalem Mountains AVA has been a designated American Viticultural Area since 2006.

See also
Picture of southern flank of the range
Bald Peak State Scenic Viewpoint
Chehalem Mountains AVA
Chehalem Ridge Nature Park
Ribbon Ridge AVA

References

External links

The Oregonian
Metro
Map

Mountain ranges of Oregon
Landforms of Washington County, Oregon
Landforms of Yamhill County, Oregon